Muddy Creek Mill is a historic grist mill complex and national historic district located in Tamworth, Cumberland County, Virginia. The district encompasses five contributing buildings and three contributing sites. The mill was built between 1785 and 1792, and is a large two-story structure with two half stories and rests on a down slope basement.  It is constructed of sandstone, rubble masonry, and brick.  Associated with the mill are a contributing brick store (c. 1800), early-19th century frame miller's house, late-18th century farmhouse and dairy, and the sites of a cooper's shop, blacksmith's shop and saw mill.

It was listed on the National Register of Historic Places in 1974.

References

External links
Muddy Creek Mill 2012, YouTube video

Grinding mills on the National Register of Historic Places in Virginia
Historic districts on the National Register of Historic Places in Virginia
Industrial buildings completed in 1792
Buildings and structures in Cumberland County, Virginia
National Register of Historic Places in Cumberland County, Virginia
Grinding mills in Virginia